The 2022 Collegiate Rugby Championship was a college rugby sevens tournament played from May 28–30, 2022 at Gold Mine on Airline in New Orleans, Louisiana. The tournament is also known as May Madness. It was the 12th annual Collegiate Rugby Championship, and the second consecutive year that the tournament was held in New Orleans. The men's Premier Cup competition consisted of 32 teams, while the women's premier cup competition featured 16 teams. The tournament as a whole featured 110 teams competing across six men’s and women’s divisions, making it the largest ever collegiate rugby tournament. All teams competed in a single elimination bracket. Lindenwood entered the tournament as three-time defending champions. Kutztown won their first CRC title defeating Dartmouth 17–12 in the final. Lindenwood won their fourth women's title defeating Life 19–7 in the final. The CBS Sports Network broadcast five matches per day with the remaining matches available on The Rugby Network. Teams which were knocked out of the Premier Cup Bracket, competed in the Champion Plate, Challenge Bowl, and the Survivor Shield. Notre Dame College won the Champion Plate, Fordham won the Challenge Bowl, and Air Force won the Survivor Shield.

Premier Cup Bracket

Final Four

DI Club finals
Men's final: Sam Houston State 17 – 15 Salisbury
Women's final: Roger Williams 12 – 7 Wisconsin–Eau Claire

Players

Most Valuable Player
Mate' Kvirikashvili (Kutztown)

Men's All Tournament Team
Kekoa Kauwe (Kutztown)
Jasper Green (Dartmouth)
Lorenzo Villani (St. Bonaventure)
Michael Weir (Dartmouth)
Evan Williams (Lindenwood)
Jonah Wolfe (Cal Maritime)
Mate' Kvirikashvili (Kutztown)

References

2022
2022 rugby union tournaments for clubs
2022 in American rugby union
2022 rugby sevens competitions
2022 in sports in Louisiana
Collegiate Rugby